Repoš was a name found in medieval Serbia; it was mentioned in 14th-century charters as a byname (or surname), and in the early 15th century as a given name.

Milorad Repoš ( 1388), son of Serbian nobleman Stanislav (fl. 1377). Mentioned in the charter of Konstantin Dejanović dated 26 March 1388.
Đurađ Repoš
Repoš or Reposh, brother of Serbian nobleman Skanderbeg (1405–1468).

References

Serbian masculine given names